John Gambling may refer to three generations of American radio-show hosts in New York City:

 John B. Gambling (1897–1974)
 John A. Gambling (1930–2004)
 John R. Gambling (born 1950)